The Laval Saints were a junior ice hockey team that played in Laval, Quebec at the Colisée de Laval. The Saints were a member of the Quebec Junior Hockey League in 1967–68, and the Metropolitan Montreal Junior Hockey League in 1963–67.

The team was promoted to, and played one season in the Quebec Major Junior Hockey League in 1969–70, coached by Hockey Hall of Fame defenceman Doug Harvey. The team's leading scorer that season was Andre Peloffy, a native of France.

NHL alumni
Four alumni of the Laval Saints graduated to play in the National Hockey League. 
 
 Serge Beaudoin (1969–70) 
 Jocelyn Guevremont (1967–68)
 Hartland Monahan (1968–69)
 Andre Peloffy (1968–70)

Yearly results

References
HockeyDB

Defunct Quebec Major Junior Hockey League teams
Sport in Laval, Quebec
Ice hockey clubs established in 1967
Ice hockey clubs disestablished in 1970
1967 establishments in Quebec
1970 disestablishments in Quebec